Olenia is a former municipality in Achaea, West Greece, Greece. Since the 2011 local government reform it is part of the municipality West Achaea, of which it is a municipal unit. The municipal unit has an area of 189.534 km2. Population 5,434 (2011). The seat of the municipality was in Lousika.  The municipality is named after the ancient Achaean town Olenus.

Subdivisions
The municipal unit Olenia is subdivided into the following communities (constituent villages in brackets):
Achaiko
Agios Nikolaos Kralis (Kalamaki, Agios Nikolaos, Avgeraiika, Thomaiika, Poimenochori)
Agios Stefanos (Agios Stefanos, Palaia Peristera, Fylakes)
Ano Soudenaiika
Arla
Chaikali (Chaikali, Katsaitaiika, Kounelaiika)
Charavgi (Charavgi, Neochori, Pigadia)
Flokas (Flokas, Zisimaiika)
Fostaina
Galanaiika
Gkaneika
Kato Mazaraki
Lousika (Lousika, Spaliaraiika, Ypsili Rachi)
Mitopoli (Mitopoli, Komi, Souvaliotaiika)
Portes
Santomeri (Santomeri, Ampelakia, Polylofo)

References

 
Populated places in Achaea